WWE Main Event is an American professional wrestling television program produced by WWE. Premiering on October 3, 2012, the hour-long program features mid-to-low-card talent from WWE's Raw brand as well as talents from SmackDown and NXT. 

Main Event is taped on Monday nights prior to WWE Raw. In the United States, Main Event streams new episodes on Hulu on Thursdays; it was initially carried by Ion Television as well until April 2014. It is also carried by WWE's international television partners.

History 
The series first aired in the United States on Ion Television, originally premiering October 3, 2012 and airing on Wednesday nights. WWE considered the show to be a spiritual replacement for WWE Superstars (which previously aired on WGN America until 2011, and transitioned to WWE's digital platforms in the U.S. afterward). Hulu acquired rights to the series as well, as part of a larger pact that included video on-demand rights for WWE's main weekly programs.

Ion Television dropped the series in April 2014; following the cancellation, WWE streamed a live episode of Main Event from Detroit on its then-new subscription service WWE Network. It was reported to be a stress test for live events on the service in preparation for WrestleMania XXX. 

Prior to November 28, 2016, Main Event was taped prior to SmackDown. It was then moved to Raw after the premiere of WWE Network's 205 Live, which was broadcast live after SmackDown from the same venue.

Main Event was initially positioned as a non-branded show, featuring performers from both the Raw and SmackDown rosters.  Following the 2016 WWE Draft, the program became exclusive to SmackDown. After the cancellation of WWE Superstars, Main Event became exclusive to Raw. In late-2022, under changes made by Triple H after being promoted to WWE's chief content officer, NXT wrestlers began to increasingly appear on Main Event, particularly to evaluate their performance and audience reception when performing with members of the main roster.

Commentators

Ring announcers

See also

WWE Velocity
WWE Superstars
WWE Heat

Notes

References

External links

2020s American television series
2012 American television series debuts
2014 web series debuts
English-language television shows
Main Event
WWE webcasts
American non-fiction web series
Main Event
WWE Raw
WWE SmackDown
Hulu original programming